The 2019 Iraq FA Cup Final was the 27th final of the Iraq FA Cup as a clubs-only competition. The match was contested between Al-Zawraa and Al-Kahrabaa, at Al-Shaab Stadium in Baghdad. It was played on 26 July 2019 to be the final match of the competition. Al-Zawraa made their record 18th appearance in the Iraq FA Cup final while Al-Kahrabaa made their first appearance. Al-Zawraa won the match 1–0 with a late goal from Safaa Hadi, for the club's record 16th title.

The winners of the cup, Al-Zawraa, qualified for the 2020 AFC Champions League preliminary round 2 as well as the 2019 Iraqi Super Cup, where they lost on penalties to league champions Al-Shorta.

Route to the Final

Note: In all results below, the score of the finalist is given first (H: home; A: away).

Match

Details

References

External links
 Iraq Football Association

Football competitions in Iraq
2018–19 in Iraqi football
Iraq FA Cup
July 2019 sports events in Iraq